Baume & Mercier is a Swiss luxury watchmaker founded in 1830. It is a subsidiary of the Swiss luxury conglomerate Richemont.

History

Baume & Mercier was founded as "Frères Baume" in 1830 by brothers Louis-Victor and Célestin Baume, who opened the watch dealership in Les Bois, a village in the Swiss Jura. The Swiss watch manufacturer established a branch in London in 1851 under the name "Baume Brothers", which led to expansion throughout the British Empire. By the late 19th century, the company had an international reputation, and its timepieces had set accuracy records and won a number of timekeeping competitions.

In 1918, company director William Baume partnered with Paul Mercier to found "Baume & Mercier" in Geneva. The firm became specialized in manufacturing wristwatches, particularly models in unconventional shapes. In 1919, Baume & Mercier was awarded the Geneva Seal, the highest international distinction of the time for watchmaking excellence.

During the Roaring Twenties, the brand embraced women's emancipation. In the 1940s, Baume & Mercier launched a number of modern watch collections, most notably the 2 Register Chronograph. Early examples of this model with the double-caseback are rare and highly sought after, often fetching more than double the price of a later model.

In the 1970s, Baume & Mercier introduced shaped timepieces such as the Galaxie and Stardust models. In 1973, Baume & Mercier presented the Riviera, one of the world's first steel sports watches.

Recent history
In 1988, the Swiss watchmaker joined the Richemont group. Currently, the brand offers the Clifton, Classima and Hampton collections for both men and women, the Capeland collection for men, and the Linea and Promesse collections for women. In 2015, Baume & Mercier bolstered its sports watch offerings by entering into a partnership with the celebrated American race carmaker Carroll Shelby International. In 2016 the company sold "Shelby Cobra" models, named for the sports car, in its Capeland and Clifton collections.

Pricing 
With an average selling price of between US$2,000 and US$7000, Baume & Mercier watches are in the lower-range luxury watch market.

In 2016, Baume & Mercier began to present more affordable offerings under US$1,000 with the launch of its "My Classima" models, a sub-collection of its Classima collection of classic dress watches.

See also

References

External links

 Baume & Mercier U.S.
 Baume & Mercier UK

Richemont brands
Luxury brands
Swiss companies established in 1830
Manufacturing companies established in 1830
Swiss watch brands
Watch manufacturing companies of Switzerland